The 1979 Colgate-Hong Kong Patrons Classic, also known as the Hong Kong Open, was a men's tennis tournament played on outdoor hard courts in Hong Kong that was part of the 1979 Grand Prix tennis circuit. It was the seventh edition of the event and was held from 5 November through 11 November 1979. First-seeded Jimmy Connors won the singles title.

Finals

Singles
 Jimmy Connors defeated  Pat DuPré 7–5, 6–3, 6–1
 It was Connors' 7th singles title of the year and the 78th of his career.

Doubles
 Pat Du Pré /  Bob Lutz defeated  Steve Denton /  Mark Turpin 6–3, 6–4

References

External links
 ITF tournament edition details

Viceroy Classic
1979 in Hong Kong
Tennis in Hong Kong